The Canon EF 90–300mm f/4.5–5.6 lens is a telephoto zoom lens for Canon EOS single-lens reflex cameras with an EF lens mount. There had been versions available: one standard version and one with USM.

Specifications

References

External links

Canon EF lenses